Cancer Moonshot may refer to:
 Cancer Breakthroughs 2020, a privately-funded project started in January 2016
 Beau Biden Cancer Moonshot, funded by the U.S. government under a law passed in December 2016